Tannersville Main Street Historic District is a national historic district located at Tannersville in Greene County, New York. The district contains 70 contributing buildings.

It was listed on the National Register of Historic Places in 2008.

References

Historic districts on the National Register of Historic Places in New York (state)
Historic districts in Greene County, New York
National Register of Historic Places in Greene County, New York